Fiesse is a comune in the province of Brescia,  Lombardy, northern Italy. It is bounded by other communes of  Asola, Casalromano, Gambara, Remedello and Volongo.

References